Knowles may refer to:

People
 Knowles (surname)

Places in the United States
 Knowles, California
 Knowles, Oklahoma
 Knowles, Wisconsin

See also
 Knowles Baronets, two Baronetcies created in the Baronetage of Great Britain and the United Kingdom